Arens Field Airport  is a public airport  north of Winamac, in Pulaski County, Indiana. The airport was founded in August 1969.

References

External links 

Airports in Indiana
Transportation buildings and structures in Pulaski County, Indiana